Senator Rhodes may refer to:

Doris Lindsey Holland Rhodes (1909–1997), Louisiana State Senate
Stephen H. Rhodes (1825–1909), Massachusetts State Senate

See also
Senator Rhoads (disambiguation)